

Project description and goals 
PROITERES (Project of OIT Electric-Rocket-Engine Onboard Small Space Ship) or 大阪工業大学 電気推進ロケットエンジン搭載小型スペースシッププロジェクト in Japanese is a satellite launched by ISRO in 2012 for Osaka Institute of Technology(OIT). This small (15 kg) boxlike system, with solar panels on the hull, is the testbench for the 4.4 W Pulsed Plasma Thruster operating on the microsatellite platform. The total power budget of the satellite is 15 watt.

PROITERES' secondary goals, as stated by the manufacturer, are:

 Experiments of two-way radio signal propagation characteristics using amateur radio (430 MHz) band.
 Communication tests of satellite communication technology using off-the-shelf consumer-grade components.
 Tracking and communicating by amateur radio users around the world.
 Monitoring with a high-resolution camera the Yodogawa basin near Osaka and other parts of Kansai District.

It is equipped with 3-axis magnetic torquers and gyro-sensors for attitude control (orientation), a magnetic sensor on the boom, a solar sensor, and the CMOS camera.

Failure 
As in 2013, PROITERES does not respond to any ground commands, although still broadcasting telemetry data.  According to the PROITERES development team report on 17 January 2014 at JAXA annual symposium, the PROITERES had a design error resulting in the flight computer engaged in a boot loop. The root cause of the boot loop was the electromagnetic incompatibility issue, resulting in a reset signal being generated if power-up ramp rate of the flight computer is high enough.

The Osaka Institute of Technology team abandoned attempts to restore communications with PROITERES satellite and proceeded with development of the PROITERES-2 design.

See also 

Miniaturized satellite

References

Satellites orbiting Earth
Spacecraft launched in 2012